Attorney General Coleman may refer to:

James P. Coleman (1914–1991), Attorney General of Mississippi
Peter Tali Coleman (1919–1997), Attorney General of American Samoa
Marshall Coleman (born 1942), Attorney General of Virginia

See also
General Coleman (disambiguation)